Ira Nelson Davenport (October 13, 1887 – July 17, 1941) was an American track athlete, football and baseball player, and coach.  He competed in the 1912 Summer Olympics held in Stockholm, Sweden in the 800 metres where he won the bronze medal. In the 400 metres event he was eliminated in the semi-finals. For a time before the Olympics, Davenport lived in Minneapolis, Minnesota, where he attended Minneapolis Central High School before going on to the University of Chicago. He also competed for the United States in the exhibition baseball tournament in Stockholm.  Davenport ran track and played football at the University of Chicago.  He served as the head football coach at Columbia College in Dubuque, Iowa, now known as Loras College, from 1920 to 1921. Davenport was later the general manager and treasurer of the Dubuque Boat and Boiler Works.

References

External links
 

1887 births
1941 deaths
American male middle-distance runners
Athletes (track and field) at the 1912 Summer Olympics
Baseball players at the 1912 Summer Olympics
College men's track and field athletes in the United States
Olympic bronze medalists for the United States in track and field
Olympic baseball players of the United States
Chicago Maroons football players
Loras Duhawks football coaches
Medalists at the 1912 Summer Olympics
People from Grant County, Oklahoma
People from Winfield, Kansas